Waikaka is a town in Southland, New Zealand. It was a gold-mining town in the 19th century, starting in 1867 when gold was found. Over NZ£1,000,000 equivalent of gold was eventually extracted from this location. The town was served by the Waikaka branch railway.

Demographics

Waikaka had a population of 1,560 at the 2018 New Zealand census, an increase of 6 people (0.4%) since the 2013 census, and unchanged since the 2006 census. There were 582 households. There were 840 males and 717 females, giving a sex ratio of 1.17 males per female. The median age was 39.0 years (compared with 37.4 years nationally), with 348 people (22.3%) aged under 15 years, 252 (16.2%) aged 15 to 29, 762 (48.8%) aged 30 to 64, and 192 (12.3%) aged 65 or older.

Ethnicities were 90.0% European/Pākehā, 6.0% Māori, 0.4% Pacific peoples, 7.5% Asian, and 1.9% other ethnicities (totals add to more than 100% since people could identify with multiple ethnicities).

The proportion of people born overseas was 12.5%, compared with 27.1% nationally.

Although some people objected to giving their religion, 42.1% had no religion, 47.5% were Christian, 1.2% were Hindu, 0.2% were Muslim, 0.2% were Buddhist and 1.3% had other religions.

Of those at least 15 years old, 195 (16.1%) people had a bachelor or higher degree, and 246 (20.3%) people had no formal qualifications. The median income was $41,400, compared with $31,800 nationally. 198 people (16.3%) earned over $70,000 compared to 17.2% nationally. The employment status of those at least 15 was that 771 (63.6%) people were employed full-time, 216 (17.8%) were part-time, and 15 (1.2%) were unemployed.

Education
Waikaka School is a full primary school for years 1 to 8 with a roll of  students as of  The school opened in 1883.

References

Populated places in Southland, New Zealand